Awn al-Din Abu'l-Muzzafar Yahya ibn Hubayra al-Shaybani al-Duri al-Baghdadi (1105-1165), commonly referred to as Ibn Hubayra, was a 12th-century Iraqi Arab official and a Hanbali jurist, who served for sixteen years as vizier of the Abbasid Caliphate under Caliph al-Muqtafi, and his successor al-Mustanjid.

Biography 
Ibn Hubayra was born on Rabi II 499 A.H. (December 1105 / January 1106 CE) in Dur, a village northwest of Baghdad. As a youth, he went to Baghdad where he received a classical Arabic education under several masters, studying the Qur'an, Arabic linguistics, and the Hanbali school of Islamic jurisprudence (fiqh). He was appointed as the chief of the treasury by caliph al-Muqtafi, and in 1149, he was appointed as the vizier (chief minister) of the Caliphate, a post he kept for sixteen years until his death on 27 March 1165, commonly attributed to poisoning through his physician, who was in the pay of his rivals.

His vizierate marked the final decline of the Seljuq influence in the Abbasid court (cf. Siege of Baghdad (1157)), and saw a flowering of Hanbali learning in Baghdad. Ibn Hubayra was also involved in the conquest of Fatimid Egypt by Nur ad-Din Zangi.

Works 
Ibn Hubayra was also an accomplished scholar. He published a multi-volume commentary on the Sahih al-Bukhari and the Sahih Muslim collections of hadith, entitled al-Ifṣāḥ ‘an ma‘ānĩ'l Ṣiḥāḥ or al-Ishrāf. He also wrote a grammar called al-Muqtaṣaḍ, an abridgment of Ibn al-Sikkit's Iṣlāḥ al-manṭiq, the al-‘Ibādāt al-khams, the Urjūza fi‘l-maqsūr wa‘l-mamdūd, and Urjūza fi ‘ilm al-khaṭṭ. A collection of his sayings was compiled by his contemporary Abu'l-Faraj ibn al-Jawzi (al-Muqtabas min al-fawā‘id al-‘Awniyya), who also published an anthology from the al-Ifṣāḥ. Ibn al-Jawzi's works are the main source on Ibn Hubayra's life, along with a biography by the Hanbali scholar Ibn al-Maristaniyya

References

Sources 
 

1105 births
1165 deaths
Iraqi Sunni Muslim scholars of Islam
Viziers of the Abbasid Caliphate
12th-century Arabic writers
Hanbalis
12th-century jurists
Iraqi qadis
12th-century Arabs
12th-century people from the Abbasid Caliphate